La Trimouille is a commune in the Vienne department and Nouvelle-Aquitaine region of western France.

Geography
La Trimouille lies 13 km east of Montmorillon and 19 km south of Le Blanc. The area's main town, Poitiers, lies 55 km away to the west-north-west, while the principal town to the south is Limoges, 73 km away.

The river Benaize flows through La Trimouille.

Demographics

See also
Communes of the Vienne department
 La Trémoille family

References

External links

 Tourisme La Trimouille (in French)
 Ileaux Serpents

Trimouille, La